Nadav Lapid is an Israeli screenwriter and film director. Film critics consider him to be among the most internationally acclaimed filmmakers from Israel.

Biography
Lapid was born in Tel Aviv, Israel, to a family of Ashkenazi Jewish descent. He is the son of writer  and film editor , he studied philosophy at Tel Aviv University, moving to Paris after his military service in the Israel Defense Forces. He returned to Israel to pursue a degree at the Sam Spiegel Film and Television School in Jerusalem.

Lapid is married to Naama Preis, an Israeli actress; they reside in Tel Aviv.

Career 
Lapid's debut feature film Policeman won the Locarno Festival Special Jury Prize at the Locarno International Film Festival in 2011.

His 2014 film The Kindergarten Teacher was featured in the 2014 International Critics' Week.

Lapid was named as a member of the jury of the International Critics' Week section of the 2016 Cannes Film Festival.

He became a recipient of the Chevalier des Arts et des Lettres in 2019.

Nadav Lapid’s film Synonyms won the Golden Bear award at the 69th Berlin International Film Festival in February 2019.

Lapid won the IFFI Best Director Award for the film at the 45th International Film Festival of India in November 2014.

Reception

Lapid is considered by the film critics to be among the most acclaimed filmmakers from Israel. He has gained reputation for "thematically and formally challenging work". His work frequently involves criticism of Israeli nationalism and identity. Lapid, commenting on the reception of his work, states that we "need someone to be in the opposition, to upset the power structure of cinema, to want to lock horns with it".

The Kashmir Files

In November 2022, Lapid was invited to head the jury at the 53rd International Film Festival of India (IFFI) in Goa.  Assessing the fifteen entries in a closing speech, he, on the behalf of the jury, singled out The Kashmir Files for pointed criticism: it was "vulgar propaganda", he said, and an "inappropriate [submission]", which had shocked his fellow jury members.

Lapid's remarks gave rise to a controversy in Indian politics, drawing backlash from the supporters and the members of the Bharatiya Janata Party, which had promoted the film, but receiving support from political opposition. Naor Gilon, Israel's ambassador to India castigated Lapid over Twitter, finding his remarks as presumptuous and insensitive; other diplomats from Israel supported Gilon. In subsequent interviews, Lapid stood by his remarks; his fellow jurors reiterated their support for his observations.

Filmography
 Road (short film) (2005)
 Emile's Girlfriend (2006)
 Policeman (2011)
 Ammunition Hill (short film, features in Footsteps in Jerusalem) (2013)
 The Kindergarten Teacher (2014)
 Why (short film) (2015)
 Diary of a Wedding Photographer (2016)
 Synonyms (2019)
 Ahed's Knee'' (2021)

References

External links

Living people
Film people from Tel Aviv
Israeli film directors
Israeli male screenwriters
Israeli soldiers
Israeli Ashkenazi Jews
Israeli people of Polish-Jewish descent
Israeli people of Lithuanian-Jewish descent
Israeli people of Czech-Jewish descent
Directors of Golden Bear winners
Chevaliers of the Ordre des Arts et des Lettres
Tel Aviv University alumni
Date of birth missing (living people)
Year of birth missing (living people)